Serbia will send a delegation to compete at the 2010 Winter Paralympics, in Vancouver. It will be fielding a single athlete, in alpine skiing.

Serbia will thus be making its Winter Paralympics début, marking the first time it competes separately from Montenegro.

Alpine skiing 

The following athlete will be Serbia's sole representative in alpine skiing:

See also
Serbia at the 2010 Winter Olympics
Serbia at the Paralympics

References

External links
Vancouver 2010 Paralympic Games official website
International Paralympic Committee official website

Nations at the 2010 Winter Paralympics
2010
Paralympics